Whitstone is a village in Cornwall, United Kingdom.

Whitstone may also refer to

Whitstone (hundred), an ancient subdivision of Gloucestershire, England
Whitstone (Somerset hundred), an ancient subdivision of Somerset, England
Whitstone School, Somerset, England

See also 
Whitestone (disambiguation)